Jules van Dongen (born 13 July 1990) is a Dutch-American professional darts player who competes in the Professional Darts Corporation (PDC) events.

Career

At Q-School in 2022, van Dongen won his Tour Card on by finishing second on the European Q-School Order of Merit, to get himself a two-year card on the PDC circuit.

Van Dongen qualified as a seed for the 2022 WDF World Darts Championship, which he was allowed to play after getting special dispensation from the PDC, but he would lose in the second round to Ryan de Vreede of the Netherlands.

World Championship results

WDF
 2022: Second round (lost to Ryan de Vreede 1–3)

Performance timeline 

PDC European Tour

References

1990 births
Living people
American people of Dutch descent
Professional Darts Corporation current tour card holders
People from Meerssen
Dutch darts players
American darts players
Sportspeople from Limburg (Netherlands)